Cristián Raúl Chaparro (born October 19, 1975 in San Isidro (Buenos Aires), Argentina) is a former Argentine footballer who played for clubs of Argentina, Chile, Bolivia, Ecuador, Colombia and Guatemala. He played as a midfielder.

Teams
  Ferro Carril Oeste 1996–2000
  Huracán 2000–2001
  Cobresal 2001–2002
  Barcelona 2002
  Audax Italiano 2003
  Municipal 2003–2004
  Jorge Wilstermann 2004
  La Gomera FC 2005
  Cúcuta Deportivo 2005
  Deportes Quindío 2006
  San José 2007
  Almagro 2007
  Municipal 2008

References
 

1975 births
Living people
Argentine footballers
Argentina under-20 international footballers
Argentine expatriate footballers
Club Almagro players
Club Atlético Huracán footballers
Ferro Carril Oeste footballers
Barcelona S.C. footballers
Cúcuta Deportivo footballers
Deportes Quindío footballers
C.D. Jorge Wilstermann players
Club San José players
C.S.D. Municipal players
Audax Italiano footballers
Cobresal footballers
Primera B de Chile players
Chilean Primera División players
Expatriate footballers in Chile
Expatriate footballers in Bolivia
Expatriate footballers in Ecuador
Expatriate footballers in Colombia
Expatriate footballers in Guatemala
Association football midfielders
People from San Isidro, Buenos Aires
Sportspeople from Buenos Aires Province